The Mendocino Complex Fire was a large complex of wildfires that burned in northern California for more than three months in 2018. It consisted of two wildfires, the River Fire and Ranch Fire, which burned in Mendocino, Lake, Colusa, and Glenn Counties in the U.S. State of California, with the Ranch Fire being California's single-largest recorded wildfire at the time until the Dixie Fire in 2021. The Ranch Fire burned eight miles northeast of Ukiah, and the River Fire burned six miles north of Hopland, to the south of the larger Ranch Fire. The Ranch Fire alone burned , making it the largest wildfire in modern California history at the time until the August Complex fire that occurred in 2020. The Ranch Fire also surpassed the size of the 315,577-acre Rush Fire, which burned across California and Nevada, as well as the Santiago Canyon Fire of 1889, which was previously believed to have been California's all-time largest wildfire.

The fires collectively destroyed 280 structures while damaging 37 others; causing at least $257 million (2018 USD) in damages, including $56 million in insured property damage and $201 million (2018 USD) in fire suppression costs. The city of Lakeport, communities of Kelseyville, Lucerne, Upper Lake, Nice, Saratoga Springs, Witter Springs, Potter Valley, and Finley, parts of Hopland, and the tribal communities of Hopland Rancheria, Big Valley Rancheria, and Habematolel Pomo of Upper Lake were evacuated.

The smaller River Fire was the first fire in the complex to be contained, reaching full containment on August 13, while the Ranch Fire continued to burn for more than a month after that, with flames on the northern flank of the Ranch Fire pushing eastward from the Snow Mountain Wilderness into Glenn County. The Ranch Fire finally reached full containment during the evening of September 18. However, the Ranch Fire continued to burn deep within containment lines until November 7, when the fire was declared to be inactive.

Timeline

July 2018
The Mendocino Complex comprises two vegetation fires that burned within miles of each other near Clear Lake, in Northern California. The first of the two fires reported was the Ranch Fire, which was reported on July 27, 2018, at 12:05 PM PDT, off Highway 20 near Potter Valley. Within hours of being reported, the fire had injured two firefighters. Approximately one hour later, the River Fire was reported on Old River Road, six miles north of Hopland, located south of the Ranch Fire. By the evening, the River Fire had burned  and destroyed two buildings, including a home. According to a 2019 report, the Ranch Fire was started by a rancher who had inadvertently sparked dry grass while hammering a metal stake while trying to find a wasp nest.

The fire threatened the University of California Hopland Research and Extension Center. High heat, low humidity, and rugged terrain challenged control of the fires, with gusty winds causing both to grow. Overnight, five more firefighters were reported injured. By the next morning, the two fires were organized under the "Mendocino Complex" name. With Red Flag Warnings in effect, the first mandatory evacuations began in Hopland and with residents along Highway 175. Mendocino College was named an evacuation center. By the afternoon, the community of Lakeport and additional areas of Lake County were placed under mandatory evacuation and, later that evening, Potter Valley and parts of Upper Lake were evacuated.

By the morning of July 29, three more structures had been destroyed, all houses. Dry and windy conditions persisted, and the lack of available firefighters due to other fires burning in the state slowed attempts at containment. The communities of Witter Springs, Finley, Saratoga Springs, Nice, Bachelor Valley, Scotts Valley, and Big Valley Rancheria were evacuated. The fires rapidly grew overnight, with the Ranch Fire totaling  and the River Fire reaching  by the morning of July 30, with the fires at 10 percent containment. Later in the afternoon of July 30, evacuation orders were lifted for Hopland, the Hopland Rancheria, and the area just north of Largo, while evacuation orders were put in place for Kelseyville and Finley. Containment of the fire declined to five percent as the fires grew in size. One more home was destroyed and one damaged.

Evacuation orders were lifted for Potter Valley in the afternoon of July 31.

August 2018
The Ranch Fire remained at 15 percent containment, while the River Fire was at 38 percent containment. Containment line improvement remained the focus of fire crews, with some crews directly fighting the fire when conditions permitted. Additional crew support arrived from the US Forest Service. Throughout the day, both fires grew, with the Ranch Fire burning into the Mendocino National Forest and south of Lake Pillsbury. Overnight, the fires remained most active in higher elevations. Mandatory evacuations were put in place in Western Lake County, particularly for areas west of Lucerne and north of Clear Lake. On the evening of August 4, the combined acreage was 229,000 acres.

On August 7, 2018, officials announced that they predicted the Mendocino Complex would last through August and into early September, compared to the earlier prediction of mid-August. By then, the fire complex had destroyed 143 structures, 75 of them residences. By late August 7, the fire complex was 34% contained. Of the two fires, the Ranch and River Fires, the River Fire was 78% contained, while Ranch Fire was only 20% contained, with flames on the northern flank still pushing towards Snow Mountain Wilderness.

By the morning of August 8, the fire had destroyed 221 buildings, while damaging another 27. By Wednesday morning, on August 8, 2018, the Mendocino Complex Fire had burned  and was 47% contained. Cal Fire estimated that containing the entire fire complex could take until September 1, over a month after it ignited on July 27. By Thursday, August 9, 2018, the total area burned had grown to 302,086 acres. By Saturday morning, on August 11, 2018, the Mendocino Complex Fire had burned , was 67% contained, and had destroyed 258 buildings.

However, the larger Ranch Fire continued to expand. Around that time, it was reported that the Ranch Fire had killed a firefighter from Utah.

August 19 was a day of chaos wherein LAFD firefighters were surrounded and had to scramble through the forest to safety. A firefighter was flown to a burn center and another four were treated for burns. Another firefighter was treated for a dislocated shoulder.

On the same day, it was reported that the Ranch Fire had stopped its forward spread.

September 2018
Afterward, the Ranch Fire stopped growing, with containment of the Ranch Fire increasing to 98% by September 4. During the next couple of weeks, containment of the Ranch Fire remained at 98%, without any further growth in size, as the fire continued burning deep within the fire perimeter, within the northern portion of the burn area. On September 19, the U.S. Forest Service reported that the Ranch Fire had been fully contained during the evening of September 18, bringing both of the fires in the Mendocino Complex to full containment. However, InciWeb stated that the Ranch Fire was not out yet, as hotspots continued to smolder deep within the containment lines of the fire.

October 2018–January 2019
Hotspots continued to persist within the perimeter of the Ranch Fire for another few months. On November 7, 2018, InciWeb stopped issuing updates on the Mendocino Complex and declared the incident to be inactive. On January 4, 2019, Cal Fire reported that the Mendocino Complex had fully been brought under control, extinguishing the fire 160 days after it had started.

Impact
The River and Ranch Fires impacted communities along the Mendocino and Lake County borders, prompting the evacuations of Lakeport, Kelseyville, Lucerne, Upper Lake, Nice, Saratoga Springs, Witter Springs, Potter Valley, Finley, parts of Hopland, and the tribal communities of Hopland Rancheria and Big Valley Rancheria.

Evacuations

As of August 2, the following evacuations were in place:
 Mendocino County
Highway CA-20 area from one mile south of Highway CA-20, east of Potter Valley Road, south of the fire perimeter, and west of Mendocino-Lake County Line.
 Lake County
Western Lake County, the area west of Lucerne at Bartlett Springs Road and Highway CA-20, south of the fire, east of the fire, north of Clear Lake including the communities of Blue Lakes, Upper Lake, Nice, Lakeport, Witter Springs, Bachelor Valley, Scotts Valley, Saratoga Springs.

Transportation
Portions of Highway CA-20 were closed from July 29 to August 8. On August 8, at 11:00 AM PDT, Highway CA-20 was open from Highway US-101 to Highway I-5.

Animals
The NorCal Livestock Evacuation and Support organization, worked with farmers to help evacuate farm animals and domestic pets. The American Society for the Prevention of Cruelty to Animals (ASPCA) and Lake County Animal Care and Control, also worked on evacuating and caring for animals displaced by the wildfires, while checking residences for pets or livestock.

Fire growth and containment progress

See also
2018 California wildfires
Santiago Canyon Fire
Holy Fire (2018)

Notes

References

External links
 
 Office of Emergency Service Fire Map

2018 California wildfires
July 2018 events in the United States
Wildfires in Mendocino County, California
Wildfires in Colusa County, California
Wildfires in Glenn County, California
Wildfires in Lake County, California